Hogsmill River Park or Hogsmill Valley is a linear park along the banks of the Hogsmill River in the Royal Borough of Kingston upon Thames in London. It stretches from the junction of Surbiton Hill Park and Elmbridge Avenue in Berrylands in the north to the junction between the river and a footpath to Manor Close in Old Malden in the south. 

Most of the site is grassland, which has a rich variety of wildlife, including locally unusual plants such as grass vetchling, devil's-bit scabious and pepper-saxifrage. Birds which breed on the site include  bullfinch, spotted flycatcher, lesser spotted woodpecker.

The site is a Site of Borough Importance for Nature Conservation, Grade 1. It is also a Local Nature Reserve (LNR) - or several LNRs. Details on Natural England's website are confused. The page for Hogsmill River Park gives the coordinates and description similar to the details on the London Parks and Gardens Trust and Greenspace Information for Greater London, but the map is of a small wood closed to the public called Hogsmill Wood, north of the A3 road and east of the Hogsmill River. Natural England also shows two duplicate LNRs on the same land, Elmbridge Open Space to the north of the A3  and Southwood Open Space to the south.

The London Loop walk goes through the park.

References

Nature reserves in the Royal Borough of Kingston upon Thames
Local nature reserves in Greater London